Sand Canyon may refer to:

Sand Canyon, Kern County, California
Sand Canyon, Los Angeles County, California
Sand Canyon Pueblo , a pueblo in the Canyons of the Ancients National Monument

See also